Events from the year 1916 in Mexico.

Incumbents

Federal government
President: Venustiano Carranza

Governors
 Aguascalientes: 
 Campeche: Joaquín Mucel Acereto
 Chiapas: José Ascención González/Blas Corral/Pablo Villanueva
 Chihuahua: Arnulfo González
 Coahuila: Bruno Neyra/Alfredo Breceda/Gustavo Espinoza Mireles
 Colima: Interim Governors
 Durango:  
 Guanajuato: Fernando Dávila
 Hidalgo: 
 Jalisco: Manuel M. Diéguez/Emiliano Degollado
 State of Mexico: Pascual Morales y Molina/Rafael Cepeda
 Michoacán: 
 Morelos: Lorenzo Vázquez/Dionisio Carreón
 Nayarit: José Santos Godínez
 Nuevo León: Nicéforo Zambrano
 Oaxaca: Juan Jiménez Méndez
 Puebla: 
 Querétaro: Federico Montes
 San Luis Potosí: Juan G. Barragán Rodríguez 
 Sinaloa: Ramón F. Iturbe
 Sonora: Plutarco Elías Calles
 Tabasco: Joaquín Ruiz/Luis Hernández Hermosillo/Heriberto Jara Corona
 Tamaulipas: Alfredo Ricaut/Andrés Osuna
 Tlaxcala:  
 Veracruz: 
 Yucatán: Salvador Alvarado Rubio
 Zacatecas:

Events
March 9 – Battle of Columbus
March 29 – Battle of Guerrero
April 12 – Battle of Parral
May 5 – Glenn Springs Raid
June 15 – San Ygnacio Raid
June 21 – Battle of Carrizal

Births
February 14
Juan Celada Salmón, engineer (Ternium) and inventor (Proceso HYL) (d. 2017)
Leopoldo Sánchez Celis, Governor of Sinaloa 1963–1968 (d. 1989)
 April 11 — Armando León Bejarano, governor of Morelos (1976-1982) (d. 2016)
June 12 – Raúl Héctor Castro, Mexican-born American politician (Democratic Party), governor of Arizona, diplomat, and judge (d. April 10, 2015).

Deaths
January 13 – Victoriano Huerta, 35th President of Mexico (b. 1850)
April 16 — Amador Salazar was a leader of the Liberation Army of the South during the Mexican Revolution (b. 1868)

Notes

References

 
Years of the 20th century in Mexico
Mexico